The 1971 Copa Libertadores de América was a football competition contested between the top clubs of the CONMEBOL federation. Uruguayan side Nacional won the competition defeating Argentine team Estudiantes de la Plata 2–0 in a playoff held in Estadio Nacional in Lima, Peru, after the two-legged series (in La Plata and Montevideo) ended with one win for each side.

It was the first Copa Libertadores won by Nacional, after three finals contested before with no success. Otherwise, Estudiantes lost their first final after three consecutive trophies won.

Qualified teams

Venues

Match details

First leg

Second leg

Playoff

References

1971
l
l
l
1971 in Uruguayan football
1971 in Argentine football
Football in Buenos Aires Province
Football in Montevideo